Overland with Kit Carson is a 1939 American Western serial film directed by Norman Deming and Sam Nelson and starring Bill Ellott, Iris Meredith, Richard Fiske and Bobby Clack.

Plot
When Pegleg and his Black Raiders threaten the westward expansion of the United States, the government sends Kit Carson and David Brent to straighten things out.

Cast
 Bill Elliott as Kit Carson
 Iris Meredith as Carmelita González
 Richard Fiske as Lieutenant David Brent
 Bobby Clack as Andy Gardner
 Trevor Bardette as Arthur Mitchell - Trapper
 LeRoy Mason as John Baxter - Trapper
 Olin Francis Trapper Pierre
 James Craig as Tennessee - Trapper
 Francis Sayles as Dr. Parker
 Kenneth MacDonald as Winchester - Trapper
 Dick Curtis as Drake - Henchman
 Richard Botiller as Natchez - Henchman (as Richard Botiller)
 Hal Taliaferro as Jim Stewart
 Flo Campbell as Stewart
 John Tyrrell as Captain Gilbert (Chs. 8-10)
 Francisco Marán as Don José Gonzalez (as Francisco Moran)
 Hank Bell as 'Broken-Hand' Fitzpatrick (Ch. 1)
 Irene Herndon as Juanita [ch. 3]
 Ermie Adams as Thor - Black Raiders Blacksmith 
 Stanley Brown as Tom Higgins - Henchman (Ch. 1)
 Art Mix as Bill Cooper - Henchman 
 Jack Rockwell as Red - Henchman

Production
Scenes from Overland with Kit Carson were used as stock footage for Blazing the Overland Trail.

Chapter titles
 Doomed Men
 Condemned to Die
 The Fight for Life
 The Ride of Terror
 The Path of Doom
 Rendezvous with Death
 The Killer-Stallion
 The Devil's Nest
 Blazing Peril
 The Black Raiders
 Foiled
 The Warning
 Terror in the Night
 Crumbling Walls
 Unmasked
Source:

References

External links 
 
 Cinefania.com
 

1939 films
1930s English-language films
American black-and-white films
Columbia Pictures film serials
1939 Western (genre) films
Films shot in Utah
Films directed by Sam Nelson
American Western (genre) films
Films with screenplays by Joseph F. Poland
1930s American films